Elections to South Ayrshire Council area were held on 6 April 1995, alongside the wider Scottish local elections. All 25 seats were up for election. Labour emerged from the election with the vast bulk of the seats.

Election result

Ward Results

References

1995 Scottish local elections
1995
20th century in South Ayrshire